Scott Patrick Miller is a former professional American football player. He played wide receiver for six seasons for the Miami Dolphins in the National Football League.
In highschool he ran a 10.96 hundred meter dash at state.

References

1968 births
Living people
Players of American football from Phoenix, Arizona
American football wide receivers
UCLA Bruins football players
Miami Dolphins players